Galit Gutman (born September 23, 1972) is an Israeli actress, television host and fashion model.

Biography
Galit Gutmman is married to photojournalist Ziv Koren and the mother of two daughters.
She began her modeling career after winning the title “Discovery of the Year.” She went on to become one of Israel's leading model.

She was a model for Castro, H & O, Croacker, Oberzon, and Dani Mizrahi.

Acting and television career
Gutman studied acting at Yoram Levinstein School of Acting and appeared in the Israeli soap opera "Ramat Aviv Gimel".   In 2003 she presented the Golden Curtain Awards of the E! channel. From 2006 to 2008, she hosted HaDugmaniot, the Israeli version of America's Next Top Model.

In 2012 she hosted "Brothers for Life", a documentary that deals with children in a family with many children.

See also
Israeli fashion
Look (modeling agency)

References

External links

1972 births
Living people
Israeli Jews
Israeli people of Romanian-Jewish descent
Israeli people of Polish-Jewish descent
Israeli female models
Israeli television actresses
Jewish female models
Israeli television presenters
Israeli women television presenters
Jewish Israeli actresses